Gleditsia rolfei is a leguminous tree in the family Fabaceae. It is found only in southern Taiwan, where it grows in the Hengchun peninsula. It is threatened by habitat loss.

References

rolfei
Endemic flora of Taiwan
Endangered plants
Taxonomy articles created by Polbot